Östra Ånneröd (or simply Ånneröd) is a place in Strömstad Municipality, Västra Götaland County, Sweden with 225 inhabitants in 2010. Since 2015 it is considered a part of Strömstad for statistical purposes.

References 

Populated places in Västra Götaland County
Populated places in Strömstad Municipality